Nogometni klub Piran, commonly referred to as NK Piran or simply Piran, was a Slovenian football club from Piran. The club was founded in 1925. The club was dissolved during the 1997–98 Slovenian Third League season. A newly established club named NK Portorož Piran was founded in 1998. The club played their home games at Pod Obzidjem Stadium.

Honours
Slovenian Third League
 Winners: 1992–93

Association football clubs established in 1925
Association football clubs disestablished in 1998
Defunct football clubs in Slovenia
1925 establishments in Slovenia
1998 disestablishments in Slovenia